As a member of FIFA and CAF, the Somalia national football team has been playing official matches since 1963.

Somalia's first game came in 1958 in Mombasa, Kenya, resulting in a 5–1 loss for Somalia against Kenya.

List of matches

1958

1963–1969

1970–1979

1980–1989

1990–1999

2000–2009

2010–2019

2020–present

See also
Somalia national football team
Sport in Somalia

Notes

References

External links
 Somalia national football team results
 Somalia national football team results

National football team results
Somalia